Jung Jung-suk (or  ; August 25, 1982 – June 26, 2011) was a South Korean women's football player who played WK-League side Daekyo Kangaroos in South Korea.

She scored six goals against Thailand in 2006 AFC Women's Asian Cup match, and she was awarded top soccer with seven goals.

She died of stomach cancer on June 26, 2011.

International goals

Honours

Korea Republic
 Women's East Asian Cup winner: 2005

References

External links 
 National Team Player Record 

1982 births
2011 deaths
South Korean women's footballers
South Korea women's international footballers
WK League players
Women's association football midfielders
Women's association football forwards
Sportspeople from South Gyeongsang Province
Deaths from stomach cancer
Footballers at the 2002 Asian Games
Asian Games competitors for South Korea